Turbin is the surname of the following people 
Neil Turbin (born 1963), American thrash metal vocalist
Nikolay Turbin (1832–?), Russian general and archaeologist
Robert Turbin (born 1989), American football running back
Sergey Turbin (1821–1884), Russian playwright and journalist
Viktor Turbin (1922–1944), Red Army officer and Hero of the Soviet Union

See also
Thorburn
Thoburn
Thulborn
Thurber (disambiguation)
Torbjörn